Sportstar is an Indian monthly sports magazine published in India by the publishers of The Hindu. Its headquarters is in Chennai.

History and profile
Sportstar was established in 1978. The magazine covers international sports, including the FIFA World Cup, UEFA Euro and the Olympics. It covers sports in India, including coverage of cricket, a widely popular sport in India. Additional coverage of sports includes football, tennis and Formula One Grand Prix.

From the 28 January 2006 issue, the magazine changed its name from The Sportstar to Sportstar and moved from  magazine  to tabloid format. In 2012 the magazine was redesigned.

The new online avatar of Sportstar was launched on 26 October 2015 at the Madras Cricket Club.

It has its own mobile app named Sportstar - Live Sports & News.

References

1978 establishments in Tamil Nadu
English-language magazines published in India
The Hindu Group
Sports magazines published in India
Weekly magazines published in India
Magazines established in 1978
Mass media in Chennai
Companies based in Chennai